A betavoltaic device (betavoltaic cell or betavoltaic battery) is a type of nuclear battery which generates electric current from beta particles (electrons) emitted from a radioactive source, using semiconductor junctions. A common source used is the hydrogen isotope tritium. 
Unlike most nuclear power sources which use nuclear radiation to generate heat which then is used to generate electricity, betavoltaic devices use a non-thermal conversion process, converting the electron-hole pairs produced by the ionization trail of beta particles traversing a semiconductor.

Betavoltaic power sources (and the related technology of alphavoltaic power sources) are particularly well-suited to low-power electrical applications where long life of the energy source is needed, such as implantable medical devices or military and space applications.

History 
Betavoltaics were invented in the 1970s. Some pacemakers in the 1970s used betavoltaics based on promethium, but were phased out as cheaper lithium batteries were developed.

Early semiconducting materials weren't efficient at converting electrons from beta decay into usable current, so higher energy, more expensive—and potentially hazardous—isotopes were used. The more efficient semiconducting materials used today can be paired with relatively benign isotopes such as tritium, which produce less radiation.

The Betacel was considered the first successfully commercialized betavoltaic battery.

Proposals 
The primary use for betavoltaics is for remote and long-term use, such as spacecraft requiring electrical power for a decade or two. Recent progress has prompted some to suggest using betavoltaics to trickle-charge conventional batteries in consumer devices, such as cell phones and laptop computers. As early as 1973, betavoltaics were suggested for use in long-term medical devices such as pacemakers.

In 2018 a Russian design based on 2-micron thick nickel-63 slabs sandwiched between 10 micron diamond layers was introduced. It produced a power output of about 1 μW at a power density of 10 μW/cm3. Its energy density was 3.3 kWh/kg. The half-life of nickel-63 is 100 years.

Recent work has indicated the viability of betavoltaic devices in high-temperature environments in excess of  like the surface of Venus.

Drawbacks 
As radioactive material emits, it slowly decreases in activity (refer to half-life). Thus, over time a betavoltaic device will provide less power. For practical devices, this decrease occurs over a period of many years. For tritium devices, the half-life is 12.32 years. In device design, one must account for what battery characteristics are required at end-of-life, and ensure that the beginning-of-life properties take into account the desired usable lifetime.

Liability connected with environmental laws and human exposure to tritium and its beta decay must also be taken into consideration in risk assessment and product development. Naturally, this increases both time-to-market and the already high cost associated with tritium.
A 2007 report by the UK government's Health Protection Agency Advisory Group on Ionizing Radiation declared the health risks of tritium exposure to be double those previously set by the International Commission on Radiological Protection located in Sweden.

As radioactive decay cannot be stopped, sped up or slowed down easily, there is no way to "switch off" the battery or regulate its power output. For some applications this is irrelevant, but others will need a backup chemical battery to store energy when it isn't needed for when it is. This reduces the advantage of high power density.

Availability 
Betavoltaic nuclear batteries can be purchased commercially. Available devices include a 100 μW tritium-powered device weighing 20 grams.

Safety 
Although betavoltaics use a radioactive material as a power source, the beta particles used are low energy and easily stopped by a few millimetres of shielding. With proper device construction (that is, proper shielding and containment), a betavoltaic device would not emit dangerous radiation. Leakage of the enclosed material would engender health risks, just as leakage of the materials in other types of batteries (such as lithium, cadmium and lead) leads to significant health and environmental concerns. Safety can be further increased by transforming the radioisotope used into a chemically inert and mechanically stable form, which reduces the risk of dispersal or bioaccumulation in case of leakage.

Efficiency
Due to the high power density of radioisotopes and the need for reliability above all else in many applications of betavoltaics, comparatively low efficiencies are acceptable. Current technology allows for single digit percentages of energy conversion efficiency from beta particle input to electricity output, but research into higher efficiency is ongoing. By comparison thermal efficiency in the range of 30% is considered relatively low for new large scale thermal power plants and advanced combined cycle power plants achieve 60% and more efficiency if measured by electricity output per heat input. If the betavoltaic device doubles as a radioisotope heater unit it is in effect a cogeneration plant and achieves much higher total efficiencies as much of the waste heat is used for useful purposes. Similar to photovoltaics, the Shockley–Queisser limit also imposes an absolute limit for a single bandgap betavoltaic device.

See also 
 Atomic battery
 Diamond battery
 Optoelectric nuclear battery
 Polyvinylidene fluoride (PVDF) thin film technology
 Radioisotope thermoelectric generator
 Radioisotope piezoelectric generator
 List of battery types

References

External links 

 University of Rochester news release
 City Labs
 Widetronix

Nuclear technology
Battery (electricity)